Cordaville is a census-designated place (CDP) in the town of Southborough in Worcester County, Massachusetts, United States. The population was 2,650 at the 2010 census.

Geography
Cordaville is located at  (42.269947, -71.526869).

According to the United States Census Bureau, the CDP has a total area of 4.8 km (1.9 mi²), all land.

Demographics

At the 2010 census there were 2,650 people, 870 households, and 741 families living in the CDP. The population density was 524.9/km (1,360.6/mi²). There were 889 housing units at an average density of 171.1/km (443.6/mi²). The racial makeup of the CDP was 87.3% White, 0.71% African American, 9.39% Asian, 0.0% Pacific Islander, 0.8% from other races, and 1.8% from two or more races. Hispanic or Latino of any race were 2.5%.

Of the 870 households 45.9% had children under the age of 18 living with them, 74.7% were married couples living together, 8.0% had a female householder with no husband present, and 14.8% were non-families. 12.1% of households were one person and 3.7% were one person aged 65 or older. The average household size was 3.04 and the average family size was 3.33.

The age distribution was 32.4% under the age of 18,The median age was 41 years. For every 100 females, there were 101.3 males.

The median household income was in 2012 Inflation adjusted dollars, the CDP was $149,425, and the median family income  was $157,097.  None of the families and 0.4% of the population were living below the poverty line, including no under eighteens and none of those over 64.

References

Census-designated places in Worcester County, Massachusetts
Southborough, Massachusetts
Census-designated places in Massachusetts